Morum kreipli is a species of sea snail, a marine gastropod mollusk, in the family Harpidae.

Description
The length of the shell attains 53.8 mm.

Distribution
This species occurs in Vietnamese Exclusive Economic Zone.

References

kreipli
Gastropods described in 2018